Henry Odili Nwume (born 10 January 1977) is a Zambian-born, British bobsledder who has competed since 2006. At the 2010 Winter Olympics in Vancouver, he finished 17th in the four-man event. He studied at Brasenose College, Oxford.

References

External links
Vancouver2010.com profile 

1977 births
Bobsledders at the 2010 Winter Olympics
British male bobsledders
Living people
Olympic bobsledders of Great Britain
Black British sportspeople
Zambian emigrants to the United Kingdom
English people of Zambian descent
People educated at Nottingham High School
Alumni of Brasenose College, Oxford